Charaxes variata is a butterfly in the family Nymphalidae. It is found in central, southern and north-western and western Zambia. The habitat consists of Cryptosepalum forests.

The larvae feed on Cryptosepalum exfoliatum pseudotaxus, Brachystegia spiciformis, Brachystegia taxifolia and Dicrostachys cinerea.

Description
A full description is provided by Van Someren, V. G. L., 1969 Revisional notes on African Charaxes (Lepidoptera: Nymphalidae). Part V. Bulletin of the British Museum (Natural History) (Entomology) 75-166.

Taxonomy
Charaxes variata is a member of the large species group Charaxes etheocles.

Described as a subspecies of Charaxes viola but ranked as a full species by Williams (2006).

References

External links
Images at Bold Charaxes variata
Bold images Charaxes variata f. caerulescens
Bold images Charaxes variata f. tricolor

Butterflies described in 1969
variata
Endemic fauna of Zambia
Butterflies of Africa